The following is an episode list for the Nick Jr. animated television series Ni Hao, Kai-Lan.

Series overview

Episodes

Season 1 (2008–09)

Season 2 (2009–10)

Season 3 (2011)

References 

 Ni Hao, Kai-Lan, Season 1 - iTunes, Season 1.
Ni Hao, Kai-Lan, Season 2 - iTunes, Seasons 2 & 3.

Ni Hao
Ni Hao
Ni Hao